Lachlan Tame (born 14 November 1988) is an Australian canoe sprinter. Tame teamed up with Jordan Wood, Murray Stewart and Riley Fitzsimmons in the men's K-4 500m at the 2020 Tokyo Olympics. The team came second in their heat with a time of 1.22:662. In their semi-final they rowed quite a bit slower but still managed to come second and qualify for the final. They couldn't keep up their good form and came sixth in the final, nearly 3 seconds behind the eventual winner, Germany.

Early years 
Tame joined the Avoca Beach SLSC as a five-year-old. He has the nickname ‘Lachie' He began ski paddling at the age of 18. He always had ambitions of qualifying for Olympic Games.

Tame won the single ski event at the 2011 Australian Surf Life Saving Championships. In 2014 he partnered with Beijing 2008 Olympics gold medalist Ken Wallace to win the World Championships silver in the K2 1000 metres.

Achievements 
Tame won the bronze medal at the 2016 Summer Olympics at Rio de Janeiro in the K2 1000m alongside Olympic champion Ken Wallace.

Based at the Avoca surf club, Tame had a $5000 bet with a mate that he could not make the London Olympics.

Tame was inducted into the Surf Life Saving Australia Hall of Fame in 2015. Widely considered as the most dominant ski paddler of his generation, Tame won four consecutive single ski, two lifesaver relays a double ski and a ski relay titles at the Australian Surf-Lifesaving Championships.

He is a two time member of the Australian Surf Life Saving Team and a three time member of the Australian Men's Kayak Team.

K2 500m World Champion, 2015 Milan, with Ken Wallace
2x K2 1000m Silver Medalist at the World Championships, 2014 Russia, 2015 Milan, with Ken Wallace

References

Living people
1988 births
Australian male canoeists
Canoeists at the 2016 Summer Olympics
Canoeists at the 2020 Summer Olympics
Olympic canoeists of Australia
Olympic bronze medalists for Australia
Olympic medalists in canoeing
ICF Canoe Sprint World Championships medalists in kayak
Medalists at the 2016 Summer Olympics
People from Gosford
Sportsmen from New South Wales
21st-century Australian people